A by-election was held in the Dáil Éireann Dublin North constituency in Ireland on 11 March 1998. It followed the resignation of Fianna Fáil Teachta Dála (TD) Ray Burke on 7 October 1997.

The election was won by Seán Ryan of the Labour Party.

The election was notable in that it had the highest number of candidates to every contest a Dáil by-election. 19 candidates contested, including 9 Independents. The election took 14 counts to declare a winner with 8 candidates getting less than 1% of the first preference vote.

On the same day, a by-election took place in Limerick East, both were the final occasions which Democratic Left contested by-elections.

Michael Kennedy would go on to serve as a TD for the constituency in the future and Clare Daly would go on to serve as a TD and MEP

Result

See also
List of Dáil by-elections
Dáil constituencies

References

External links
https://electionsireland.org/result.cfm?election=1997B&cons=96
http://irelandelection.com/election.php?elecid=49&electype=2&constitid=16

1998 in Irish politics
28th Dáil
By-elections in the Republic of Ireland
By-elections in County Dublin
March 1998 events in Europe
1990s in Dublin (city)
1998 elections in the Republic of Ireland